Anthurium crassinervium is a species of flowering plant in the family Araceae, native to Venezuela and Colombia in South America, and some Caribbean islands (the Netherlands Antilles, the southwest Caribbean and the Venezuelan Antilles). It was first described by Nikolaus Joseph von Jacquin in 1791 as Pothos crassinervius and transferred to Anthurium in 1829 by Heinrich Wilhelm Schott.

References

crassinervium
Flora of Colombia
Flora of the Dutch Caribbean
Flora of the Netherlands Antilles
Flora of the Southwest Caribbean
Flora of the Venezuelan Antilles
Flora of Venezuela
Plants described in 1791
Flora without expected TNC conservation status